Charlene Tse Ning (born October 9, 1963 in Guangzhou, China), also known as Shallin Tse, is a Hong Kong-based Chinese actress. A Hakka, she is the winner of the 1985 Miss Hong Kong Pageant. She has acted in numerous television series produced by Hong Kong's TVB.

Filmography

TV series
New Heavenly Sword and Dragon Sabre (1986)
Genghis Khan (1987)
Two Most Honorable Knights (1988)
The Sword and the Sabre (1989)
Deadly Secret (1989)

References

20th-century Hong Kong actresses
TVB actors
1963 births
Living people
Hong Kong people of Hakka descent
People from Meixian District
Actresses from Guangzhou
Miss Hong Kong winners
Actresses from Guangdong
Hong Kong television actresses
Chinese film actresses
Chinese television actresses
20th-century Chinese actresses
21st-century Chinese actresses
21st-century Hong Kong actresses